The Crédit national was a former French banking institution created under the impetus of Charles François Laurent, an expert in international financing, by a special law on , located on the border between the private domain and the sphere of influence of the French State.

The G.I.E. Crédit National Syndication was struck off the commercial register on August 2, 1995.

Leaders

Presidents 
 Charles Lawrence: 1919
 Louis Martin: 1920 — 1936
 Wilfrid Baumgartner: 1936 — 1949
 Jacques Brunet: 1949 — 1960
 John Saltes: 1960-1972
 Bernard Clappier: 1973 — 1974
 André de Lattre: 1974 — 1982
 Jean Saint-Geours: 1982 — 1987
 Paul Mentré: 1987 — 1990
 Yves Lyon-Caen: 1990 — 1993
 Jean-Yves Haberer: 1993 — 1994
 Emmanuel Rodocanachi: 1994 — 1998

Directors 
 Marcel Frachon: 1919 — 1929
 Jean du Buit: 1929 — 1942

See also 

 Crédit Foncier de France
 Bank of France
 Timeline of banks in Europe

Notes

Sources 
 Robert beef,  The National Credit , Paris, Presses Universitaires de France, 1923.
  The National Credit, medium credit institution and long term,  1951.
  National Credit 1919-1969 , Paris, Havas-Conseil 1969.
 Patrice Baubeau Arnaud Lavit d'Hautefort, Michel Lescure,  The National Credit from 1919 to 1994. public history of a private company,  Paris, JC Lattes, 1994.
  National Committee Corporate Credit. Jubilee 1945-1995  1995.

External links 
 "National Credit, medium credit institution and long term" (1951) on  persee.fr  (on French)
 Le Crédit National - Archives pour une histoire de la production cinématographique française (1941-1966) (Cinémathèque française) (on French)

Companies established in 1919
Companies disestablished in 1998
Defunct banks of France
Banks based in Paris
Banks established in 1919
BPCE